Chloe Linda Daisy Margaret Sims (born 2 November 1981) is an English television personality. From 2011 to 2021, she appeared in the ITVBe reality series The Only Way Is Essex, in which she was the longest serving cast member.

Early life
Sims was raised by her father Tony Sims following her mother leaving when Sims was three years old. Sims has three siblings who all appeared alongside her on The Only Way Is Essex.

Career
In 2011, Sims began appearing in the ITVBe reality series The Only Way Is Essex. She is the cousin of two former cast members, Joey Essex and Frankie Essex. In 2018, Sims appeared in the fifth series of Celebs Go Dating; and in 2019 in the seventh series, alongside her sister Demi Sims. In July 2022, Sims announced that she had left The Only Way Is Essex; her two sisters, Frankie and Demi, announced their departure alongside her. Following her departure Sims was the longest serving cast member. In 2022, she appeared in the ITV2 series Celebrity Karaoke Club, and was later pictured auditioning for the fifteenth series of Dancing on Ice.

Personal life
She has a daughter, Madison Green, born in 2005. Madison appeared alongside Sims in The Only Way Is Essex. Sims was in a relationship with fellow The Only Way Is Essex cast member Elliot Wright from 2014 to 2015.

Filmography

References

External links 
 
 

Living people
1981 births
English female models
English businesspeople
People from Romford
People from Brentwood, Essex
English people of Irish descent
Television personalities from Essex
English people of French descent
English television personalities
English people of German descent
Glamour models